The Chronicles is the first compilation album by American rapper E.S.G. from Houston, Texas. It was released on January 29, 2008 through Scarred 4 Life Entertainment with distribution via Select-O-Hits.

Track listing
 "Intro"
 "Crooked Streets"
 "Swangin' & Bangin'"
 "Flipping" (featuring Lil' Will)
 "Ocean of Funk"
 "Birdies Don't Chirp"
 "I'm The Boss"
 "Down Here" (featuring Lil' Keke & Scarface)
 "Skit"
 "Watch Out" (featuring Big Hawk)
 "Dirty Hustle"
 "Ride Wit Us"
 "Comin' Down" (featuring Fat Pat)
 "Southside Pop Trunk" (featuring Big T & Brandy)
 "Ride Wit Us (Remix)" (featuring Bun B & Chamillionaire)
 "Actin' Bad"
 "Southside Baby"

References

E.S.G. (rapper) albums
2008 compilation albums
Gangsta rap compilation albums